Neuquén Basin is a sedimentary basin covering most of Neuquén Province in Argentina. The basin originated in the Jurassic and developed through alternating continental and marine conditions well into the Tertiary. The basin bounds to the west with the Andean Volcanic Belt, to the southeast with the North Patagonian Massif and to the northeast with the San Rafael Block and to the east with the Sierra Pintada System. One age of the SALMA classification, the Colloncuran, is defined in the basin, based on the Collón Curá Formation, named after the Collón Curá River, a tributary of the Limay River.

Description 
Jurassic and Cretaceous marine transgressions from the Pacific are recorded in the sediments of Neuquén Basin. These marine sediments belong to Cuyo Group, Tordillo Formation, Auquilco Formation and Vaca Muerta. In the Late Cretaceous, conditions in the neighboring Andean orogeny changed. A marine regression occurred and the fold and thrust belts of Malargüe (36°00 S), Chos Malal (37° S) and Agrio (38° S) started to develop in the Andes and did so until Eocene times. This meant an advance of the Andean orogenic deformation since the Late Cretaceous that made the western part of Neuquén Basin to stack in the Malargüe and Agrio fold and thrust belts. This caused a shift in deposition from Pacific to Early Atlantic.

In the south of Mendoza Province, the Guañacos fold and thrust belt (36.5° S) appeared and grew in the Pliocene and Pleistocene consuming the western fringes of the Neuquén Basin.

Tectonics 
The Huincul basement high or Huincul ridge is a geological structure that divides Neuquén Basin in two parts. The basement high is one of the most studied features of Neuquén Basin given its importance for hydrocarbon exploration and exploitation. There have been proposals on the nature of this structure. In the 1970s and 1980s it was proposed by that it was a transpressive fault zone. In 2009, Pángaro described it as being made up of inverted half-grabens.

Unconformities have been registered in the basin and were dated at 98, 117, 123, 129, 134 and 154 Ma.

Stratigraphy 
 
The basin contains many stratigraphic units from the Triassic onwards, with large regional variations from east to west and north to south, often described as different formations that are laterally equivalent, this list is a comprehensive overview of described formations:

Cenozoic
 Tromen Formation (Holocene)
 Cerro Campanario Formation (Late Pleistocene-Holocene)
 El Puente Formation (Middle Pleistocene)
 Chapúa Formation (Early Pleistocene)
 Agua de la Caldera Formation (Pleistocene)
 El Sauzal Formation (Pleistocene)
 Coyocho Formation (Middle Miocene-Early Pleistocene)
 Bayo Mesa Formation (Late Pliocene to Pleistocene)
 Los Pinos Formation (Late Pliocene)
 Pampa Encima Formation (Late Pliocene)
 Chenqueniyeu Formation (Pliocene)
 Chapelcó Formation (Pliocene)
 Rincón Bayo Formation (Middle Pliocene)
 Chos Malal-Trahalhué Formation (Late Miocene-Early Pliocene)
 El Palo Formation (Late Miocene to Early Pliocene)
 Arroyo Palao Formation (Late Miocene)
 Tristeza Formation (Late Miocene)
 Río Negro Formation or Caleufú Formation (Middle to Late Miocene)
 Barranca de los Loros Formation (Late Miocene-Early Pliocene)
 Collón Cura Formation (Colloncuran)
 Cerro Bandera Formation (Colhuehuapian)
 Chichinales Formation (Colhuehuapian)
 Vaca Mahuida Formation (Late Oligocene to Middle Miocene)
 Sierra Negra Formation (Oligocene-Early Miocene)
 Palauco Formation (Oligocene)
 Lolog Formation (Late Eocene)
 Colpilli Formation (Eocene)
 Cayanta Formation (Eocene)
 Ventana Formation (Lutetian, early Mustersan)
 Huitrera Formation (Paleocene to Oligocene)

Mesozoic
 Malargüe Group
 Agua de la Piedra Formation (Deseadan to Early Miocene)
 Pircala Formation (Paleocene)
 Coihueco Formation (Paleocene)
 El Carrizo Formation (Danian)
 Roca Formation (Danian in the south, late Maastrichtian in the north)
 Loncoche Formation (Maastrichtian to Danian)
 Jagüel Formation (middle to late Maastrichtian)
 Allen Formation (middle Campanian to early Maastrichtian)
 Diamante Formation (Cenomanian-Campanian)
 Neuquén Group
 Río Colorado Subgroup (Santonian to early Campanian)
 Anacleto Formation (early Campanian)
 Bajo de la Carpa Formation (Santonian)
 Río Neuquén Subgroup (late Turonian to Coniacian)
 Plottier Formation (late Coniacian ?to early Santonian)
 Sierra Barrosa Formation (middle to late Coniacian)
 Los Bastos Formation (early to middle Coniacian)
 Portezuelo Formation (late Turonian to early Coniacian)
 Río Limay Subgroup (Cenomanian to early Turonian)
 Lisandro Formation (late Cenomanian to early Turonian)
 Huincul Formation (late Cenomanian)
 Candeleros Formation (early Cenomanian)
 Los Machís Formation (Cenomanian to Santonian)
 Late Mirano unconformity (98 Ma)
 Lohan Cura Formation (Late Aptian to Albian)
 Rayoso Group (Aptian to Albian)
 Rayoso Formation (Albian)
 Middle Mirano unconformity (117 Ma)
 Huitrín Formation (Aptian)
 La Amarga Formation (Barremian to early Aptian)
 Early Mirano unconformity (123 Ma)
 Centenario Formation (Valanginian) to Barremian)
 Mendoza Group (early Tithonian to earliest Aptian
 Agrio Formation (Hauterivian to earliest Aptian) or late Valanginian to latest Barremian
 Unconformity (129 Ma)
 Chachao Formation (Valanginian to Hauterivian)
 Unconformity (134 Ma)
 Mulichinco Formation (Valanginian)
 Bajada Colorada Formation (Late Berriasian to Early Valanginian)
 Loma Montosa Formation (Berriasian to Valanginian)
 Quintuco Formation (Berriasian to Valanginian)
 Picún Leufú Formation (Tithonian to Berriasian)
 Lindero de Piedra Formation
 Vaca Muerta (Tithonian to Berriasian)
 Quebrada del Sapo Formation (Kimmeridgian)
 Catriel Formation (Kimmeridgian)
 Tordillo Formation (Kimmeridgian)
 Unconformity (154 Ma)
 Río Damas Formation (Late Jurassic)
 Lotena Group (middle Callovian to late Oxfordian)
 Auquilco Formation (late Oxfordian)
 La Manga Formation (early Oxfordian)
 Lotena Formation (Callovian to Oxfordian)
 Cuyo Group (Pliensbachian to middle Callovian)
 Challaco Formation (Bathonian)
 Tábanos Formation (Callovian)
 Calabozo Formation (Middle Jurassic)
 Punta Rosada Formation
 Lajas Formation (Bajocian to Bathonian)
 Tres Esquinas Formation (Toarcian to Callovian)
 Los Molles Formation (Pliensbachian to Callovian)
 Chuchil Formation (Pliensbachian)
 Piedra del Aguila Formation (Early to Middle Jurassic)
 Sañicó Formation (Early to Middle Jurassic)
 Sierra Chacaico Formation (Early to Middle Jurassic)
 Puesta Araya Formation (Hettangian to Bathonian)
 El Freno Formation (Pliensbachian to Toarcian)
 Primavera Formation (Hettangian to Sinemurian)
 Lapa Formation (Hettangian to Sinemurian)
 Nestares Formation (Early Jurassic)
 Planicie Morada Formation (Late Triassic to Sinemurian)
 Paso Flores Formation (Late Triassic)
 Milla Michicó Formation (Late Triassic)
 Remoredo Formation (Late Triassic)
 Chihuido Formation (Late Triassic)
 Tronqulmalal Formation (Mid-Late Triassic)
 Cordillera del Viento Formation (Early to Middle Triassic)

Paleozoic
 Choiyoi Group (Late Permian-Mid Triassic)
 El Palque Formation
 Horcajos Formation
 Portezuelo del Cenizo Formation
 Tambillos Formation
 Vega de Los Machos Formation

Petroleum geology 
The Neuquén Basin is an important oil and gas producing basin in Argentina. The basin is also important for unconventionals, with the Vaca Muerta and Los Molles formations being major shale gas producers.

Source rock formations are predominantly the Vaca Muerta, and to a lesser extent the Agrio and Los Molles Formations. Reservoir rocks comprise the Mulichinco and Chachao Formations. Deeper reservoirs are the Lotena and Barda Negra Formations. Regional seal rocks are the evaporites of the Auquilco and Huitrín Formations, with local seals the Vaca Muerta, Agrio and Catriel Formations.

Notes and references

Notes

References

Bibliography 
Geologic map
 

General
 
 
 
 
 
 
 
 
 
 
 
 
 
 
 
 
  

Mesozoic
 
 
 
 
 
 

Vaca Mahuida Formation
 

Ventana Formation
 
 

Chichinales Formation
 
 

Cerro Bandera Formation

Further reading 
 
 
 

 
Sedimentary basins of Argentina
Sedimentary basins of Chile
Geology of Mendoza Province
Geology of Neuquén Province
Geology of La Pampa Province
Geology of Río Negro Province
Geology of Araucanía Region
Geology of Biobío Region
Foreland basins
Oil fields in Argentina
Natural gas in Argentina
Shale gas
Mapuche language